Larry Maluma is a Zambian reggae artist based in Australia. He left Zambia in 1985. He is an accomplished musician, composer and singer. He sings in a combination of English and Zambian languages, Nyanja, Bemba and Tonga, adopting styles which he has used to blend his own brand of roots music. The resulting unique sound has put some of his songs at the top of the Zambian charts.

Music career 
Since arriving in Australia in 1985, Maluma has broadened the Australian perspective of African music. He has released 12 albums  and more than 15 music video clips which have been aired on the ABC program Rage.

References

External links 
 

Living people
Australian reggae musicians
Year of birth missing (living people)
Zambian emigrants to Australia
20th-century Zambian male singers
21st-century Zambian male singers